The 2018 Atlético Nacional season was the 71st season in the club's history. The team competed in the Categoría Primera A, Copa Colombia, Superliga Colombiana, and Copa Libertadores.

Players

First-team squad

Out on loan

Transfers
Source: Soccerway

In

Out

Pre-season and friendlies

Competitions

Overall

Categoría Primera A

Torneo Apertura

Note: For a complete table see the main article

Home-away summary

Match results

†: Match postponed due to participation in the Copa Libertadores.
‡: Match postponed due to Deportivo Cali's participation in the Copa Sudamericana.

Knockout phase

Quarterfinals

Semifinals

Finals

Torneo Finalización

Note: For a complete table see the main article

Match results

Copa Libertadores

Group stage

Final stages

Round of 16

Copa Colombia

Round of 16

Quarterfinals

Semifinals

Finals

Superliga Colombiana

Statistics

Squad statistics

 

Source: Soccerway

Goals

Disciplinary record

References

External links
Atlético Nacional - Official Website
Soccerway - Atlético Nacional

Atlético Nacional seasons